Luis Enrique Monroy Bracamontes is a Mexican convicted murderer who killed two police officers in Northern California. On October 24, 2014, Bracamontes opened fire on three Northern California sheriff's deputies, killing two and wounding the third, while a civilian was also wounded in the shooting. Bracamontes is a citizen of Mexico and a convicted drug dealer who was in the United States illegally. Bracamontes was sentenced to death in 2018.

Bracamontes' case earned attention during the 2018 midterm elections when the Trump administration ran an ad blaming Democrats for the murders by Bracamontes. Cable channels such as Fox News, CNN, and NBC stopped airing the ad; and Facebook banned it from its platform.

Arrests and deportations 
Bracamontes is an illegal immigrant who had been previously deported twice. He was first deported in 1997 after being convicted in Arizona on charges of possessing narcotics for sale. In 1998, he was arrested again on drug charges in Phoenix, but was released "for reasons unknown" by former Maricopa County Sheriff Joe Arpaio.  

Bracamontes was arrested and deported to Mexico again in 2001.

Shootings and criminal conviction 
Bracamontes was using the name Marcelo Marquez when he, with a female accomplice, shot and killed a sheriff's deputy, Danny Oliver of the Sacramento County Sheriffs Department, in the Arden-Arcade neighborhood of Sacramento. He then carjacked several vehicles and shot a driver. Bracamontes then fatally shot another police officer, Detective Michael Davis of the Placer County Sheriffs Department, when he was located in the Auburn Area; he also seriously wounded Davis' partner. He was eventually taken into custody after an extensive manhunt in the area. After a lengthy courts process of about four years, which was highlighted by his repeated outbursts and other actions in the courtroom, Bracamontes was sentenced to death in 2018.

Responses 
The shooting came to national attention in debates over the Obama administration's policies on immigration in the fall of 2014. The shootings came to national attention again when President Trump invited Jessica Davis and Susan Oliver, the widows of slain officers Detective Michael Davis and Deputy Sheriff Danny Oliver, to attend his first address to a joint session of Congress on 28 February 2017.

Trump administration advertisement 
Approximately one week before the 2018 midterm elections, the Trump administration ran an advertising that linked Bracamontes to Democrats, accusing Democrats of letting Bracamontes and other dangerous, undocumented immigrants into the United States. The ad drew widespread and bipartisan condemnation and was compared to the infamous Willie Horton ad during the 1988 presidential campaign. Republican Senator Jeff Flake said the ad was "a new low in campaigning" and "sickening", Republican Ohio Governor John Kasich said "all Americans should reject this ad and its motives" and Representative Carlos Curbelo condemned the ad as part of a "a divide-and-conquer strategy".

Fact-checkers at PolitiFact, The Washington Post and The Sacramento Bee found that the assertions "Democrats let him (cop killer Luis Bracamontes) into our country" and "Democrats let him stay" were false. CNN refused to air the ad, describing it as a "racist anti-immigration commercial". NBC and Fox News aired the ad, but later said they would not air it. Facebook pulled the ad from its platform, saying it violated community standards.

See also 
 List of homicides in California
 Colorado sanctuary city controversy
 Illegal immigration to the United States and crime
 List of death row inmates in the United States
 List of law enforcement officers killed in the line of duty in the United States
 Murder of Jamiel Shaw II
 Office of Victims of Immigration Crime Engagement
 Shooting of Kathryn Steinle

References 

1970 births
Living people
Prisoners sentenced to death by California
Mexican murderers
People convicted of murder by California